Endless Love: Original Motion Picture Soundtrack is the soundtrack album to the film of the same name. The album was released worldwide by Mercury Records and PolyGram in 1981.

While the Endless Love movie itself faded into obscurity, the film's soundtrack and its theme song by Diana Ross and Lionel Richie, also called "Endless Love", certainly did not. The song was a No. 1 hit on the Billboard Hot 100, and nearly 30 years after its release still remains the best-selling single of Ross' career. The single stayed at No. 1 for no less than nine weeks from August 9 to October 10, 1981, making it the biggest-selling single of the year in the US. It also topped the Billboard R&B chart and the Adult Contemporary chart as well as becoming a top ten hit single in the UK, peaking at No. 7. It also reached the top ten charts in most parts of the world. The duet single was released by Motown Records worldwide since both artists were still signed to that label at the time, and in effect, became the most successful single in Motown history. It however became Ross' final hit single for the label; shortly thereafter, she signed a then record-breaking $20 million deal with RCA Records. Her first album for her new label, the self-produced Why Do Fools Fall in Love,  released the same year, included a solo version of "Endless Love". The Endless Love soundtrack also included a second duet with Ross and Richie, "Dreaming of You", and both songs were also included as orchestral versions alongside Jonathan Tunick's original score.

While Ross' appearance on the Endless Love soundtrack marked the end of an era as she left Motown after twenty years on the label, Lionel Richie's work for the album instead became a new beginning in his career both as a composer, producer and an artist in his own right. The "Endless Love" single was released while he was still officially a member of the Commodores. The success of the duet encouraged Richie to branch out into a full-fledged solo career, releasing his self-titled debut album in 1982 which produced another chart-topping single, "Truly", continuing the style of his ballads with the Commodores like "Easy", "Three Times a Lady" and "Still", as well as ballads Richie composed and produced for other artists like "Lady" for Kenny Rogers which hit No. 1 in 1980.

The soundtrack album also featured two tracks that were not originally recorded for the actual film: KISS' "I Was Made for Lovin' You", first released on their album Dynasty, a No. 11 hit on Billboard'''s singles chart in 1979, as well as Cliff Richard's "Dreamin'", written by singer Leo Sayer and producer Alan Tarney, originally included on Richard's album I'm No Hero, also a top ten hit in the UK in 1980. Blondie's 1979 US and UK No. 1 hit "Heart of Glass" which also briefly appeared in the movie was not included on the soundtrack album.

The Endless Love'' soundtrack was re-released on CD by PolyGram in 1998; this 1998 CD version is now out-of-print. In December 2014, PolyGram re-released the CD soundtrack in Japan under Universal Japan SHM-CD.

Track listing

Side A
"Endless Love" (Lionel Richie) – 4:26
Performed by Diana Ross and Lionel Richie
"Dreaming of You" (Thomas McClary, Richie) – 4:31
Performed by Ross and Richie
"I Was Made for Lovin' You" (Paul Stanley, Desmond Child, Vini Poncia) – 3:59
Performed by Kiss
"Dreamin'" (Leo Sayer, Alan Tarney) – 3:37
Performed by Cliff Richard
"Endless Love" (Theme) (Richie) - 2:45
Instrumental

Side B
"Dreaming of You" (Theme) (Richie) – 4:44
Instrumental
"Heart Song" (Jonathan Tunick) – 1:42
Instrumental
"David Goes to Jade's House" (Tunick) – 3:35
Instrumental
"Ann Sees David and Jade Making Love" (Tunick) – 3:32
Instrumental
"David at the Institution" (Dialogue) (Tunick) – 4:28
Instrumental
"Endless Love" (Reprise) (Richie) – 4:27
Performed by Ross and Richie

Charts

Certifications

Personnel
Lionel Richie - lead and backing vocals on "Endless Love" and "Dreaming of You"
Diana Ross - lead vocals on "Endless Love" and "Dreaming of You"
KISS - performers on "I Was Made for Lovin' You"
Cliff Richard - lead vocals on "Dreamin'"
Sonny Burke - Fender Rhodes
David Cochrane - bass guitar, backing vocals
Paulinho Da Costa - percussion
Nathan East - bass guitar
Barnaby Finch - piano
Ed Greene - drums
Paul Jackson Jr. - acoustic and electric guitar
Thomas McClary - guitar
Sylvester Rivers - Moog synthesizer
Rick Shlosser - drums
Deborah Thomas - backing vocals
David T. Walker - guitar

Production
Lionel Richie - producer ("Endless Love" and "Dreaming of You")
Vini Poncia - producer ("I Was Made for Lovin' You")
Alan Tarney - producer ("Dreamin'")
Peter Guber - record and soundtrack producer
Jon Peters - record and soundtrack producer
Charles Koppelman - executive producer
Adam Fields - executive producer
Brenda Richie - production assistant
Jonathan Tunick - arranger, conductor
Gene Page - horn arrangements, string arrangements, rhythm arrangements
Harry Bluestone - concertmaster
Reginald Dozier - sound engineer, mixing engineer
Michael Mancini - sound engineer, mixing engineer
Jeff Lancaster - package design

Sources and external links
[ Allmusic Diana Ross biography]
[ Allmusic Lionel Richie biography]
Official Charts Company, UK chart history
IMDB.com, Endless Love

References

1981 soundtrack albums
Mercury Records soundtracks
PolyGram soundtracks
albums arranged by Gene Page
Romance film soundtracks
Drama film soundtracks